The 2011–12 Copa del Rey was the 2nd staging of the Copa del Rey de Futsal. The competition began on October 8, 2011 and finished with the final on May 15, 2012. The final took place at Pabellón Fernando Argüelles in Antequera, Andalusia.

FC Barcelona Alusport won its second title in a row by defeating ElPozo Murcia 6–3 in the Final.

Calendar

Qualified teams
16 clubs of Primera División
14 clubs of Segunda División
24 clubs of Segunda División B

First round
Matches played on 12 October 2011.

Second round
Matches played on 1 November 2011.

Third round
Matches played on 5 & 6 December 2011.

Fourth round

Final phase bracket

Quarter finals

Semifinals

1st leg

2nd leg

Final

See also
2011–12 Primera División de Futsal
2012 Copa de España de Futsal

References

External links
lnfs.es

Copa del Rey de Futsal seasons
Copa
Fut